Kardemir Demir Çelik Karabükspor or simply known as Kardemir Karabükspor or Karabükspor is a Turkish sports club based in Karabük. The team was founded in 1969 after a merger between "Karabük Gençlikspor" and "Demir Çelik Spor". The club has in branches in football, wheelchair basketball and volleyball. The nickname of the club is Mavi Ateş; Blue Flame. The nickname comes from unfading blue flame coming out of one of the chimneys of Kardemir iron-steel works which is located in the entrance of the city. As the factory gives its name to the club, the team is cited as a worker's team. The clubs finances collapsed during the 2017–18 Süper Lig season, leaving the club in a precarious position that involved multiple successive relegations, losing almost every game they have played since, as their finances force them into using a team composed of amateur youth players.

History

Foundation and early history
In the year 1938, Azmi Tılabar, the head manager of the Turkish iron-steel industry, founded DÇ Gençlik Kulübü; DÇ Youth Club with grey-blue colours. In these times, the trainer of the football team was an English engineer Mr. Lain. The trainer of athletism was Turkish athlete Faik Önen. Moreover, Mersinli Ahmet and Yaşar Doğu were trainers of wrestling. During the 1940s, Karabükspor became a symbol in cycling, tennis, and wrestling around Turkey. Starting in the 1950s, the "Karabük Gençlikspor" joined "DÇ Gençlik Kulübü" and finally, the club got its colours as red-blue.

The 1990s
In the last game of the 1993–94 season against Zeytinburnuspor, Karabükspor relegated from the Süper Lig. Karabükspor promoted to the top tier after winning the promotion play-off in the 1996–97 season. Karabükspor finished 8th in 1997–98. The next season, however, was disastrous for them as they again relegated to the second level. Karabükspor relocated to the Second League B Category in the 2001–02 season.

The 2000s
The team was promoted to the TFF First League in the 2007–08 season after a 7–0 win against Erzurumspor in the promotion group. On their 30th game of the 2009–10 season, they won 3–0 against Çaykur Rizespor which meant they were promoted to the Süper Lig after 11 years.

2017-18 Relegation
The 2017–18 Süper Lig season was a disaster for the club and resulted in their relegation. Erkan Sözeri resigned following poor early performances. On 1 October 2017 the club appointed Australian coach Tony Popovic to run the side. His stint in charge lasted 2 months, during which time the entire board quit the club. Popovic was replaced by Levent Açıkgöz, who was himself sacked on 21 March 2018 and replaced by Ünal Karaman. The coaching changes, financial ruin and poor performances all contributed to the club finishing in last place with only three wins and three draws for the entire season.

Relegation Freefall
With no money and little in the way of talent to sell, the clubs precarious financial position required them to use low paid youth players and this saw Karabükspor suffer back to back relegations. They finished last in the 2018/19 TFF First League, winning no games, drawing only three and suffering a negative 102 goal difference. They finished the season with zero points after a 3 point administrative penalty was assessed on the club.

The 2019/20 season, where the club competed in the 3rd tier TFF Second League saw a brief respite from relegation as the Turkish government suspended all the leagues due to the COVID-19 pandemic in Turkey, with relegations cancelled for the season.

They continued their plunge down the pyramid with another last place finish, in the 2020/21 season. They scored just one win and three draws, while another 3 point administrative penalty had them end the season on only 3 points. They were relegated into the fourth tier TFF Third League system.

Their season in the 4th tier did not see any improvement, and the side were relegated once again, this time into the 5th tier amateur league system.

In October 2022, the club was unable to field a team two games in a row due to player shortages which ultimately resulted in relegation to the 6th tier amateur league system.

Past seasons

Domestic results

Note: In the 2019/20 season all relegations were postponed due to the Coronavirus pandemic causing the cancellation of the season, while promotions continued as normal. Additional relegation slots were added to the 2020-21 season to rebalance the size of the leagues for the 2021/22 season.

League participations
Süper Lig: 1993–94, 1997–99, 2010–15, 2016–18
TFF First League: 1972–73, 1974–83, 1984–93, 1994–97, 1999–01, 2008–10, 2015–16, 2018–19
TFF Second League: 1969–72, 1973–74, 1983–84, 2001–08, 2019–21
TFF Third League: 2021–2022
Regional Amateur League: 2022–
Amateur League: 1983–84

European record

Notes
 3Q: Third qualifying round
 PO: Play-off round

Supporters
The club are sponsored by the Kardemir company and the Iron workers unions from whom they draw a lot of their support, making it a club with true working class identity. Their ultra group is called Mavi Ateş (Blue Flame) and their motto is, Dumanlı kentin puslu çocukları (Sons of the smoky city).

Current sponsors
 Kardemir
 Çelik-iş Sendikası (Labor union of the workers in Kardemir Iron & Steel Works)

Players

Current squad

Notable players
Africa
Burkina Faso
 Abdou Traoré 
Cameroon
 Dany Nounkeu 
DR Congo
 Lomana LuaLua 
Gabon
 André Poko 
Mali
 Mustapha Yatabaré 
 Samba Sow 
Nigeria
 Emmanuel Emenike 
Europe
Bosnia and Herzegovina
 Sanel Jahić
 Ermin Zec 
Montenegro
 Vladimir Rodić 
Norway
 Morten Gamst Pedersen 
Turkey
 Hüseyin Çakıroğlu
 Bilal Kısa
 Osman Çelik 
 Musa Çağıran 
Ukraine
 Yevhen Seleznyov 
South America
Argentina
 Luis Ibáñez

Technical staff

References

External links

Official website
Karabükspor on TFF.org

 
Sport in Karabük
Football clubs in Turkey
1969 establishments in Turkey
Süper Lig clubs